Marinucci is a surname. Notable people with the surname include:

Angela Marinucci, one of the six criminals jailed for the murder of Jennifer Daugherty
Carla Marinucci, American political reporter
Chris Marinucci (born 1971), American ice hockey player
Domenico Marinucci, Italian academic
[[Giuseppe Marinucci], Artist 1925-1981 https://www.askart.com/auction_records/Giuseppe_Marinucci/11288851/Giuseppe_Marinucci.aspx